Vita lögner (White lies) is a Swedish soap opera that aired on TV3, (1997–2002). The plot focused on the social life of the hospital staff and families in the fictional town of Strömsvik. Vita lögner was TV3's first big soap opera hit after Kanal5 bought Vänner och fiender from them in 1997.
Many big stars in Sweden have done roles in the show, among them Alexander Skarsgård, Petra Hultgren, Anna Järphammar,  Maud Adams and Per Morberg. Charlotte Perrelli (then Nilsson) had a bigger role as Milla Svensson during 1997-1998.
It was after Kanal5 bought the rights to Vänner och fiender and TV3 saw what a huge success the show was for the channel that they decided to produce Vita lögner to compete over the same time slot.

DVD 
Scanbox has suggested that the series will be released on DVD. When the original material, however, was found to be of poor technical quality, the proposal had been put on hold until further notice. Later Scanbox chose not to issue the series.

Actors 

Rune Sandlund – Göran Fridell (1997–2001)
Pia Green – Ingrid Fridell (1997–2001)
Petra Hultgren – Annika Fridell (1997–1999)
Eric Rydman – Patrik Fridell (1997–1999)
Måns Nathanaelson – Jan Stipanek (1999–2001)
Johan Gry – Anders Ståhlberg (1997–1998)
Christina Hagman – Linda Åkesson (1997–1998)
Jeanette Holmgren – Gunilla Persson (1997–2000)
Per Morberg – Roger Rönn (1997–1999)
Cajsalisa Ejemyr – Tessan Almgren (1997–1999)
Ulf Dohlsten – Hasse Persson (1997–2001)
Anna Järphammar – Mikaela Malm (1997–2001)
Lena B Nilsson – Elsa Gren (1997–1999)
Hanna Alström – Magdalena Gren (1997–1998)
Jesper Salén – Jonas Persson (1997–1998)
Isabel Munshi – Sophia Ekberg (1997–2000)
Staffan Kihlbom – Felix Södergren (1997)
Ann-Sofie Olofsson – Sara Lindefors (1998–2001)
Anton Körberg – Adam Frick (1998–2001)
Mikael Ahlberg – Mårten Rudberg (1999–2000)
Karin Bergquist – Emma Rudberg (1999–2000)
Emma Peters – Alexandra Brink (1999–2000)
Erik Ståhlberg – Peter Lundholm (1999–2001)
Alexander Skarsgård – Marcus Englund (1999)
Jesper Eriksson – Henrik Ståhlberg (1999–2000)
Petronella Wester – Eva Holm (2000–2001)
Niclas Wahlgren – Stefan Jensen (2000–2001)
Cecilia Bergqvist – Helena Thorén (2000–2001)
Victoria Brattström – Klara Gabrielsson (2000–2001)
Vanessa Svanergren – Stella (2001)
Lars Bethke – Tomas Fredriksson (2000–2001)
Moa Gammel – Julia Wallgren (2000–2001)
Jarmo Mäkinen – Piru (1999–2000)
Julio Cesar Soler Baró – Fransisco “Paco” Rios (2001)
Richard Ulfsäter – Ola Lind (2000)
Pär Berglund – Kryckman

References

External links 

Swedish television soap operas
1997 Swedish television series debuts
2002 Swedish television series endings